Lisa Franks (born 6 April 1982) is a Canadian paralympic athlete from competing mainly in category T52 wheelchair sprint events. Throughout her wheelchair racing career she set world records in the 100m, 200m, 400m, 800m, 1500m, 5000m, and marathon events.

Career
Lisa has won six paralympic gold medals. In the 2000 Summer Paralympics she won gold medals in the 200m, 400m, 800m and 1500m and a silver medal in the 100m. In 2004 she defended her 200m and 400m titles. She was coached by Clayton Gerein who was a Paralympic medallist in wheelchair racing. The two were introduced by Gerein's wife who was Lisa's physiotherapist.

In readiness for the 2008 Summer Paralympics Lisa had taken up wheelchair basketball and was a part of the Canadian team that finished fifth.

Personal life
On April 18, 1996, just after Frank's fourteenth birthday, she woke up in the middle of the night unable to move her legs. By the end of that day she had lost function of her arms as well, though she regained use of those after rehabilitation. Franks was diagnosed with arteriovenous malformation, a condition that caused clusters of blood vessels to prevent blood from properly passing by her spinal cord.

She graduated from the University of Saskatchewan in 2006 with a Bachelor of Engineering and a focus in mechanical engineering.

She was awarded an Honorary Doctorate from the University of Regina in 2009. and appointed as an Honorary Colonel in the Royal Canadian Air Force in 2019.

References

1982 births
Paralympic track and field athletes of Canada
Paralympic wheelchair basketball players of Canada
Athletes (track and field) at the 2000 Summer Paralympics
Athletes (track and field) at the 2004 Summer Paralympics
Wheelchair basketball players at the 2008 Summer Paralympics
Sportspeople from Moose Jaw
Paralympic gold medalists for Canada
Paralympic silver medalists for Canada
Wheelchair category Paralympic competitors
Living people
People with paraplegia
Canadian female wheelchair racers
Paralympic wheelchair racers
Medalists at the 2000 Summer Paralympics
Medalists at the 2004 Summer Paralympics
Paralympic medalists in athletics (track and field)